The University of Camagüey "Ignacio Agramonte" (UC) is a public university located in Camagüey, Cuba. It was founded in 1967 and is organized in 9 Faculties.

Scientific Publications
The UC currently has 8 scientific journals, most of them accredited in the National Registry of Serial Publications.
Revista de Producción Animal (Animal Production Journal). Animal Production Magazine. Founded in 1985, by the Faculty of Agricultural Sciences. It has a printed and digital version. Has an English version.
Retos de la Dirección (Management Challenges). Founded in 2007, by the Faculty of Economic and Legal Sciences. It has a printed and digital version. Has an English version.
Transformación (Transformation) Edited by the Department of Scientific - Pedagogical Information of the Directorate of Technical Scientific Information.
Agrisost Founded in 1995 at the then José Martí Higher Pedagogical Institute, it belongs to the Faculty of Agricultural Sciences and publishes about sustainable agriculture and its teaching.
Monteverdia - Dedicated to environmental studies.
Arcada (Arcade). Electronic journal. Edited by the Faculty of Constructions. 
Ciencia y deportes (Science and Sports- Journal of the Faculty of Sports

The UC also has an institutional digital repository where you can consult the postgraduate theses and scientific publications, in Rediuc

See also 

Education in Cuba
List of colleges and universities in Cuba 
 Camagüey

External links
  

Universities in Cuba
University of Camaguey
Educational institutions established in 1967
1967 establishments in Cuba
Buildings and structures in Camagüey Province